"Who's Your Baby" is a single released by The Archies, a fictional bubblegum pop band from the Archie Comics universe in 1970.  It was written by Jeff Barry and Andy Kim.  It is a non-album single released before the group released their Sunshine album.  It peaked at No. 40 on the Billboard Hot 100. It is their last top 40 hit. Its B-Side, "Señorita Rita" is featured on their Jingle Jangle album. "Who's Your Baby" was first issued on Kirshner Records and was issued in most of the world on the RCA Records label.

Chart performance

References

1970 singles
1970 songs
The Archies songs
Songs written by Jeff Barry
Songs written by Andy Kim